This is a list of things named after George W. Bush,  the 43rd president of the United States.

Schools
 George W. Bush Elementary School in St. Paul, Texas
 George W. Bush Elementary School in Stockton, CA

Libraries
 George W. Bush Presidential Center in Dallas, Texas

Fashion
 Bush Shoes - a Crocs-style shoe named after Bush by Taiwan residents

Roads
 President George W. Bush Bridge across the Red River border between Oklahoma and Texas
 George Walker Bush Highway in Accra, Ghana
 George W. Bush Street in Tbilisi, Georgia
 George W. Bush Street in Tirana, Albania
 George W. Bush Plaza in central Jerusalem

See also
Presidential memorials in the United States
List of places named for George Washington
List of places named for Thomas Jefferson
List of places named for James Monroe
List of places named for Andrew Jackson
List of places named for James K. Polk
List of things named after Ronald Reagan
List of things named after George H. W. Bush
List of things named after Bill Clinton
List of things named after Barack Obama
List of things named after Donald Trump
List of educational institutions named after presidents of the United States

References

George W. Bush-related lists
Bush, George W.